The phrase "bad dog" is spoken to domestic dogs when they have misbehaved or disobeyed instructions.

Bad Dog may also refer to:

Radio stations 
 WGFG, Orangeburg, South Carolina
 WMXZ, Isle of Palms, South Carolina
 WSCZ, Winnsboro, North Carolina
 WWBD, Sumter, South Carolina

Television 
 Bad Dog!, a reality series on Animal Planet
 Bad Dog (TV series), a 1998–1999 Canadian cartoon series
 "Bad Dog" (Beavis and Butt-head), an episode of Beavis and Butt-head
 "Bad Dog" (Frasier), an episode of Frasier

Other media 
 Bad Dog (comics), a comic series by Joe Kelly and Diego Greco
 Bad Dog (series), a book franchise by Martin Ed Chatterton
 "Bad Dog", a screen saver in the After Dark series
 The Bad Dog Theatre Company, an improvisational theatre company in Toronto, Canada
Bad Dogs, the male half of Vivid BAD SQUAD in Hatsune Miku: Colorful Stage!